King Rama IX Memorial Park is a public park currently under construction in the Dusit district of Bangkok, Thailand. The project was initiated by King Vajiralongkorn (Rama X) to commemorate his father King Bhumibol Adulyadej and mother Queen Sirikit. The park occupies the former grounds of the Nang Loeng Racecourse, the land of which is owned by the Crown Property Bureau, and construction is expected to last until 2024. The park has as its central feature a large bronze statue of King Bhumibol, which was unveiled by Vajiralongkorn on 13 October 2022, the sixth anniversary of the late king's death.

Gallery

Notes

References

Parks in Bangkok
Monuments and memorials to Bhumibol Adulyadej
Dusit district